Robert Edward Roselli (December 10, 1931 – November 6, 2009) was an American professional baseball player, a catcher who played in Major League Baseball between the  and  seasons. He was born in San Francisco.

Following his discharge, Roselli played in parts of three seasons with the Braves as a backup for Del Crandall (1955–56, 1958), and later joined the Chicago White Sox to help Sherm Lollar for two years (1961–62). His most productive season came with the 1961 White Sox, when he hit a career-high .263 in 22 games.

In a five-season career, Roselli was a .219 hitter (25-for-114) with two home runs and 10 RBI in 68 games, including eight runs, seven doubles, one triple, and one stolen base.

Following his big-league career, Roselli played for Triple-A Hawaii Islanders in 1963, his last baseball season. After retiring, he was a scout for the Baltimore Orioles and Cincinnati Reds, worked as a salesman and also coached youth baseball teams.
 
Roselli died in Roseville, California, at the age of 77.

See also
1955 Milwaukee Braves season
1956 Milwaukee Braves season
1958 Milwaukee Braves season
1962 Chicago White Sox season
1961 Chicago White Sox season

External links
BR major league statistics
BR minor league statistics
Retrosheet
The Sacramento Bee - Obituary

1931 births
2009 deaths
Baltimore Orioles scouts
Baseball players from San Francisco
Chicago White Sox players
Cincinnati Reds scouts
Hartford Chiefs players
Hawaii Islanders players
Major League Baseball catchers
Milwaukee Braves players
Modesto Reds players
Sacramento Solons players
Toronto Maple Leafs (International League) players
Ventura Braves players
Wichita Braves players